Boophis luteus is a species of frog in the family Mantellidae.
It is endemic to Madagascar.
Its natural habitats are subtropical or tropical moist lowland forests, subtropical or tropical moist montane forests, rivers, and heavily degraded former forest.
It is threatened by habitat loss. The Boophis luteus has a snout vent length 35-60mm; males 35-40mm, one female 51mm. Their venter is bluish to greenish, and the skin on their back is smooth.

References

luteus
Endemic frogs of Madagascar
Amphibians described in 1882
Taxonomy articles created by Polbot